Wolfpack Party is the second and final studio album by the Bay Area rap group The Pack. The album was released on August 24, 2010 through SMC Recordings.

Singles
"Wolfpack Party 2010" was the first single from the album, and it was released March 16, 2010, on iTunes. The second single, "Sex on the Beach," was released on iTunes June 15, 2010. "Sex on the Beach" was released as an EP on iTunes on the same day.  The EP included 3 songs: "Sex on the Beach", "Wolfpack Party 2010", and "Hoes in the House".

Track listing
Writing and production credits adapted from liner notes.

Reception
Wolfpack Party garnered better critical reception than the Pack's previous album, Based Boys. The album debuted at #7 on the iTunes Rap/Hip Hop chart The album sold 844 copies in its first week. The album had peaked at #65 on the R&B/Hip-Hop Albums and #34 on the Heatseekers albums.

References

2010 albums
The Pack (group) albums
Albums produced by the Cataracs
SMC Recordings albums